Harvard is an unincorporated community in Camp County, in the U.S. state of Texas. According to the Handbook of Texas, the community had a population of 48 in 2000.

History
The Texas and St. Louis Railway built a track through here in the late 1870s and the Harvard community developed around its railroad switch station. It was described as "low-lying and easily flooded", with a long grade and a curve coming up from the creek bottom. A man named Hard Ivory built a home here and became a section foreman on the railroad. Other African-American settlers followed and settled around the area. Ivory then built a cotton gin in the area so the farmers could make cotton. There was also a coal mine in the area. In the 1930s, the community had a sawmill, two stores, and a Methodist and Baptist church. It only had one church and several scattered houses in 1964. It gained two small stores in 1983 and had a population of 48 in 2000.

Geography

Education
Harvard had a one-room school in the 1930s. It had two teachers employed and taught first through 7th grades. It had an enrollment of 47 black students. They then went to school in either Pittsburg or Center Point for the higher grades. Since 1955, Harvard has been served by the Pittsburg Independent School District.

References

Unincorporated communities in Camp County, Texas
Unincorporated communities in Texas